Mukesh Duggal was an Indian film producer who has produced many notable films of 90's. Duggal's lone directorial Gopi Kishan and Saathi were commercially successful films.

Career
Mukesh Duggal started his career as a producer with the 1991 Sanjay Dutt starrer Fateh, followed by the successful Saathi, directed by Mahesh Bhatt starring Aditya Pancholi and Pakistan cricketer Mohsin Khan in lead roles. Duggal made his debut as a director with Gopi Kishan, the 1994 Sunil Shetty (double role) starrer. Dil Ka Kya Kasoor with late Divya Bharti, Platform starring Ajay Devgn and Khilona starring Monica Bedi were his other notable films.

Death
On 7 March 1998, Duggal was killed at Seven Bungalows, Andheri, by unidentified people for using actress Monica Bedi forcibly to act as a mediator between the financiers and the underworld, as per a Crime Branch official.

Filmography

References

External links

1998 deaths
Indian film producers
Indian film directors
Film producers from Mumbai
1998 murders in India
People murdered by Indian organised crime
People murdered in Mumbai
Hindi film producers
Indian murder victims